Suranjith Silva (born 4 March 1975) is a Sri Lankan former cricketer. He played in 127 first-class and 66 List A matches between 1993/94 and 2009/10. He made his Twenty20 debut on 17 August 2004, for Sebastianites Cricket and Athletic Club in the 2004 SLC Twenty20 Tournament.

References

External links
 

1975 births
Living people
Sri Lankan cricketers
Badureliya Sports Club cricketers
Burgher Recreation Club cricketers
Lankan Cricket Club cricketers
Sebastianites Cricket and Athletic Club cricketers
Sinhalese Sports Club cricketers
Place of birth missing (living people)